Ernst Alfred Ruh , born 23 February 1936, is a Swiss mathematician, specializing in differential geometry.

Ernst Ruh received his doctorate in 1964 from Brown University under Katsumi Nomizu with thesis On the Automorphism Groups of a G-structure. He is a professor at Ohio State University and a professor of computer science at the University of Basel (1987/89). In 1990 Ruh became a full professor (professor ordinarius) of mathematics at the University of Fribourg; he was the successor of Josef Schmid. In 2006 he retired as professor emeritus.

His name is attached to the Gromov-Ruh theorem. He was an invited speaker at the International Congress of Mathematicians at Berkeley in 1986. He became a fellow of the American Mathematical Society in 2012.

Selected publications
with Jaak Vilms: 

with Karsten Grove and Hermann Karcher:

References

External links
 Ernst Ruh: entry in SNF - P3 research database
 Festkolloquium "Geometry and Analysis" for Ernst Ruh (70th birthday)
 Ernst A. Ruh: entry from Microsoft Academic Search

1936 births
Living people
20th-century  Swiss mathematicians
21st-century  Swiss mathematicians
Differential geometers
Brown University alumni
Academic staff of the University of Basel
Ohio State University faculty
Academic staff of the University of Fribourg
Fellows of the American Mathematical Society